Andrzej Józef Śliwiński (January 6, 1939  September 9, 2009) was the first bishop of the Polish Roman Catholic Diocese of Elbląg. The diocese was established on March 25, 1992.

Biography
Śliwiński was born in Werblinia, Poland, in 1939. He was ordained a Catholic priest on December 17, 1961.

Andrzej Śliwiński became the first Bishop of the Roman Catholic Diocese of Elbląg upon its creation on March 25, 1992. He remained the head of the diocese until August 2, 2003, and was succeeded by Elbląg's second bishop, Jan Styrna.
 
Bishop Andrzej Śliwiński died on September 8, 2009, in Elbląg, Poland, at the age of 70.

References 
 Catholic Hierarchy: Bishop Andrzej Józef Sliwinski 

1939 births
2009 deaths
21st-century Roman Catholic bishops in Poland
People from Elbląg
20th-century Roman Catholic bishops in Poland